Conant  is a ghost town in Lake County, Florida stretching from the area of Lady Lake, Florida to north of the Marion County, Florida line. It was established by in 1884 and named for Sherman Conant.  It was a "real estate town" developed by the Hollingshead Firm. During the Great Freeze crops died and the town experienced wildfires, forcing many members of the community to relocate. By 1919, it was merely a ghost town.

Conant had a large hotel; a steam railroad stopped within a few miles from town.

External links 

 Conant on Ghosttowns.com
 Littleton Historical Society on Conant

References 

Ghost towns in Florida